Chanel Brissett (born August 10, 1999) is an American track and field athlete who specializes in the 100 metres hurdles. She won the silver medal in the women's 100 metres hurdles event at the 2019 Pan American Games held in Lima, Peru. She also won the bronze medal in the women's 4×100 metres relay event.

References

External links 
 

Living people
1999 births
Place of birth missing (living people)
American female hurdlers
Athletes (track and field) at the 2019 Pan American Games
Medalists at the 2019 Pan American Games
Pan American Games silver medalists for the United States
Pan American Games bronze medalists for the United States
Pan American Games medalists in athletics (track and field)
Pan American Games track and field athletes for the United States
USC Trojans women's track and field athletes
Texas Longhorns women's track and field athletes
21st-century American women